Juan Miguel Ojeda Gauto (born 4 April 1998) is a Paraguayan footballer who plays as central defender for Brazilian club Cuiabá, on loan from 12 de Octubre.

Club career
Born in Asunción, Ojeda was a Sportivo Luqueño youth graduate. He made his first team – and Primera División – debut on 31 March 2019, coming on as a second-half substitute in a 3–1 home win over River Plate Asunción.

Ojeda scored his first senior goal on 11 August 2019, netting his team's only in a 1–3 loss at Olimpia. On 19 January 2021, he moved to fellow top tier side 12 de Octubre.

On 30 December 2021, Ojeda was announced at Campeonato Brasileiro Série A club Cuiabá, after signing a one-year loan deal with the club.

Personal life
Ojeda's father, also named Juan, was also a footballer.

Career statistics

References

1998 births
Living people
Sportspeople from Asunción
Paraguayan footballers
Association football defenders
Paraguayan Primera División players
Sportivo Luqueño players
12 de Octubre Football Club players
Cuiabá Esporte Clube players
Paraguayan expatriate footballers
Paraguayan expatriate sportspeople in Brazil
Expatriate footballers in Brazil